Justice Morgan may refer to:

David Morgan (judge) (1849–1912), associate justice of the North Dakota Supreme Court
Declan Morgan (born 1952), Lord Chief Justice of Northern Ireland
John T. Morgan (judge) (c. 1830–1910), associate justice of the Idaho Supreme Court
Joseph H. Morgan (1884–1967), associate justice of the Arizona Supreme Court
June P. Morgan (1917–1998), associate justice and chief justice of the Supreme Court of Missouri
Philip H. Morgan (1825–1900), associate justice of the Louisiana Supreme Court
Richard Morgan (Ceylonese judge) (1821–1876), acting chief justice of Ceylon
Robert E. Morgan, associate justice of the South Dakota Supreme Court
William McKendree Morgan (1869–1942), associate justice and chief justice of the Idaho Supreme Court
Justice Morgan (footballer) (born 1991), Nigerian footballer